My Friend Dino is a Canadian docufiction film, directed by Jimmy Larouche and released in 2016. A fictionalized documentary about the life of Dino Tavarone, who spent four years in prison for drug trafficking before finding fame playing a mafia boss in the television series Omertà in the 1990s, the film focuses on his life in his 70s as he battles a serious illness.

The film's cast also includes Michel Côté, Manuel Tadros, Joëlle Morin and Sasha Migliarese. Côté, Tadros and Morin played versions of themselves, while Migliarese played Tavarone's daughter Meredith.

Migliarese received a Prix Iris nomination for Revelation of the Year at the 19th Quebec Cinema Awards in 2017.

References

External links

2016 films
Canadian docufiction films
Films shot in Montreal
Films set in Montreal
Quebec films
French-language Canadian films
2010s Canadian films